Poison Gas may refer to:

 a toxic gas
 a chemical weapon
 Chemical weapons in World War I
 Poison Gas (film), a 1929 German silent drama